A functional neurologic disorder or functional neurological disorder (FND) is a condition in which patients experience neurological symptoms such as weakness, movement disorders, sensory symptoms and blackouts. Symptoms of functional neurological disorders are clinically recognisable, but are not categorically associated with a definable organic disease. The intended contrast is with an organic brain syndrome, where a physiological cause can be identified. Subsets of functional neurological disorders include functional neurological symptom disorder (FNsD), conversion disorder, and psychogenic movement disorder/non-epileptic seizures. The diagnosis is made based on positive signs and symptoms in the history and examination during consultation of a neurologist (see below). Physiotherapy is particularly helpful for patients with motor symptoms (weakness, gait disorders, movement disorders) and tailored cognitive behavioural therapy has the best evidence in patients with dissociative (non-epileptic) attacks.

Signs and symptoms
There are a great number of symptoms experienced by those with a functional neurological disorder. While these symptoms are very real, their origin is complex, since it can be associated with severe psychological trauma (conversion disorder), and idiopathic neurological dysfunction. The core symptoms are those of motor or sensory dysfunction or episodes of altered awareness:
 Limb weakness or paralysis
 Blackouts (also called dissociative or non-epileptic seizures/attacks) – these may look like epileptic seizures or faints
 Movement disorders including tremors, dystonia (spasms), myoclonus (jerky movements)
 Visual symptoms including loss of vision or double vision
 Onset obsessive compulsive disorder and heightened anxiety
 Speech symptoms including dysphonia (whispering speech), slurred or stuttering speech
 Sensory disturbance including hemisensory syndrome (altered sensation down one side of the body)
 Dizziness and balance problems

Associated conditions
Epidemiological studies and meta-analysis have shown higher rates of depression and anxiety in patients with FND compared to the general population, but rates are similar to patients with other neurological disorders such as epilepsy or Parkinson's disease.  This is often the case because of years of misdiagnosis and accusations of malingering.

Causes
A systematic review found that stressful life events and childhood neglect were significantly more common in patients with FND than the general population, although many patients (around 70%) report no stressors.

Converging evidence from several studies using different techniques and paradigms has now demonstrated distinctive brain activation patterns associated with functional deficits, unlike those seen in actors simulating similar deficits.  The new findings advance current understanding of the mechanisms involved in this disease, and offer the possibility of identifying markers of the condition and patients' prognosis.

FND has been reported as a rare occurrence in the period following general anesthesia.

Diagnosis
A diagnosis of a functional neurological disorder is dependent on positive features from the history and examination.

Positive features of functional weakness on examination include Hoover's sign, when there is weakness of hip extension which normalises with contralateral hip flexion. Signs of functional tremor include entrainment and distractibility. The patient with tremor should be asked to copy rhythmical movements with one hand or foot. If the tremor of the other hand entrains to the same rhythm, stops, or if the patient has trouble copying a simple movement this may indicate a functional tremor. Functional dystonia usually presents with an inverted ankle posture or clenched fist.
Positive features of dissociative or non-epileptic seizures include prolonged motionless unresponsiveness, long duration episodes (>2minutes) and symptoms of dissociation prior to the attack. These signs can be usefully discussed with patients when the diagnosis is being made.

Patients with functional movement disorders and limb weakness may experience symptom onset triggered by an episode of acute pain, a physical injury or physical trauma. They may also experience symptoms when faced with a psychological stressor, but this isn't the case for most patients. Patients with functional neurological disorders are more likely to have a history of another illness such as irritable bowel syndrome, chronic pelvic pain or fibromyalgia but this cannot be used to make a diagnosis. FND does not show up on blood tests or structural brain imaging such as MRI or CT scanning. However, this is also the case for many other neurological conditions so negative investigations should not be used alone to make the diagnosis. FND can, however, occur alongside other neurological diseases and tests may show non-specific abnormalities which cause confusion for doctors and patients.

ICD-11 diagnostic criteria
The International Classification of Disease (ICD-11) have listed functional disorders within the neurology section for the first time, where it's named "Dissociative neurological symptom disorder".

DSM-5 diagnostic criteria 
The Diagnostic and Statistical Manual of Mental Illness (DSM-5) lists the following diagnostic criteria for functional neurological symptoms (conversion disorder):

 One or more symptoms of altered voluntary motor or sensory function.
 Clinical findings can provide evidence of incompatibility between the symptom and recognized neurological or medical conditions.
 Another medical or mental disorder does not better explain the symptom or deficit.
 The symptom or deficit results in clinically significant distress or impairment in social, occupational, or other vital areas of functioning or warrants medical evaluation.

Differential diagnoses
Multiple sclerosis has some overlapping symptoms with FND, potentially a source of misdiagnosis.

Treatment
Treatment requires a firm and transparent diagnosis based on positive features which both health professionals and patients can feel confident about. It is essential that the health professional confirms that this is a common problem which is genuine, not imagined and not a diagnosis of exclusion.

A multi-disciplinary approach to treating functional neurological disorder is recommended.
Treatment options can include:
 Physiotherapy and occupational therapy
 Medication such as sleeping tablets, painkillers, anti-epileptic medications and anti-depressants (for patients with depression co-morbid or for pain relief)

Physiotherapy with someone who understands functional disorders may be the initial treatment of choice for patients with motor symptoms such as weakness, gait (walking) disorder and movement disorders.  Nielsen et al. have reviewed the medical literature on physiotherapy for functional motor disorders up to 2012 and concluded that the available studies, although limited, mainly report positive results.

For many patients with FND, accessing treatment can be difficult.  Availability of expertise is limited and they may feel that they are being dismissed or told 'it's all in your head' especially if psychological input is part of the treatment plan. Some medical professionals are uncomfortable explaining and treating patients with functional symptoms.  Changes in the diagnostic criteria, increasing evidence, literature about how to make the diagnosis and how to explain it and changes in medical training is slowly changing this.

Prevalence
Dissociative (non-epileptic) seizures account for about 1 in 7 referrals to neurologists after an initial seizure, and functional weakness has a similar prevalence to multiple sclerosis.

History
From the 18th century, there was a move from the idea of FND being caused by the nervous system. This led to an understanding that it could affect both sexes. Jean Martin Charcot argued that, what would be later called FND, was caused by "a hereditary degeneration of the nervous system, namely a neurological disorder".

In the 18th century, the illness was confirmed as a neurological disorder but a small number of doctors still believed in the previous definition. However, as early as 1874, doctors, including W.B. Carpenter and J.A. Omerod, began to speak out against this other term due to there being no evidence of its existence.

Although the term "conversion disorder" has been used for many years, another term was still being used in the 20th century. However, by this point, it bore little resemblance to the original meaning. It referred instead to symptoms that could not be explained by a recognised organic pathology, and was therefore believed to be the result of stress, anxiety, trauma or depression. The term fell out of favour over time due to the negative connotations. Furthermore, critics pointed out that it can be challenging to find organic pathologies for all symptoms, and so the practice of diagnosing that patients who had such symptoms were imagining them led to the disorder being meaningless, vague and a sham-diagnosis, as it did not refer to any definable disease.

Throughout its history, many patients have been misdiagnosed with conversion disorder when they had organic disorders such as tumours or epilepsy or vascular diseases. This has led to patient deaths, a lack of appropriate care and suffering for the patients. Eliot Slater, after studying the condition in the 1950s, was outspoken against the condition, as there has never been any evidence to prove that it exists. He stated that "The diagnosis of 'hysteria' is a disguise for ignorance and a fertile source of clinical error. It is, in fact, not only a delusion but also a snare".

In 1980, the DSM III added 'conversion disorder' to its list of conditions. The diagnostic criteria for this condition are nearly identical to those used for hysteria. The diagnostic criteria were:

A. The predominant disturbance is a loss of or alteration in physical functioning suggesting a physical disorder. It is involuntary and medically unexplainable

B. One of the following must also be present:
 A temporal relationship between symptom onset and some external event of psychological conflict.
 The symptom allows the individual to avoid unpleasant activity.
 The symptom provides opportunity for support which may not have been otherwise available.

Today, there is a growing understanding that symptoms are real and distressing, and are caused by an incorrect functioning of the brain rather than being imagined or made up.

Controversy
There was historically much controversy surrounding the FND diagnosis. Many doctors continue to believe that all FND patients have unresolved traumatic events (often of a sexual nature) which are being expressed in a physical way. However, some doctors do not believe this to be the case. Wessely and White have argued that FND may merely be an unexplained somatic symptom disorder.

References

Further reading 

 

Neurological disorders